The 1996 NCAA Division III men's basketball tournament was the 22nd annual single-elimination tournament to determine the national champions of National Collegiate Athletic Association (NCAA) men's Division III collegiate basketball in the United States.

The field contained sixty-four teams, each allocated to one of four sectionals played on campus sites. The national semifinals, third-place final, and championship final, meanwhile, were contested at the Salem Civic Center in Salem, Virginia. Salem would remain the home of the Division III final four through the 2017–18 season.

Rowan defeated Hope, 100–93, in the final, clinching their first national title. 

The Profs (28–4) were coached by John Giannini. Giannini would go on to coach at Maine and La Salle at the Division I level.

Championship Rounds
Site: Salem Civic Center, Salem, Virginia

See also
1996 NCAA Division III women's basketball tournament
1996 NCAA Division I men's basketball tournament
1996 NCAA Division II men's basketball tournament
1996 NAIA Division I men's basketball tournament
1996 NAIA Division II men's basketball tournament

References

NCAA Division III men's basketball tournament
NCAA Men's Division III Basketball
Ncaa Tournament
Sports competitions in Salem, Virginia